Meinolf Mehls (born 24 July 1965) is a retired German football midfielder.

References

External links
 

1965 births
Living people
German footballers
Bundesliga players
VfL Bochum players
VfL Bochum II players
SpVgg Erkenschwick players
Sportfreunde Siegen players
Sportspeople from Bochum
Association football midfielders
Footballers from North Rhine-Westphalia